Bifröst is a small settlement in western Iceland, in the Mýrasýsla county.

It is located in the Northwest Political constituency and is the site of Bifröst University, a small private campus university. In the town of Bifröst there is a convenience store called Samkaup strax, a coffee house, a kindergarten and a gym among other things.

Grábrókarhraun

Bifröst is surrounded by a 3,000-year-old ʻaʻā lava (or apalhraun) field, Grábrókarhraun , which has been overgrown with moss and heather. It is part of the around 90 km long volcanic system of Ljósufjöll. Just behind the university campus are some craters which produced the lava field, the biggest one is called Grábrók (Stóra Grábrók ) and the one beside it Grábrókarfell .

References

Populated places in Western Region (Iceland)